The primary traditional Ekoi deities are Obassi Osaw, the sky god, and Obassi Nsi, the earth god, similar to the Efik. Ancestors and natural forces are also emphasized in Ekoi worship. Various Ekoi cults are devoted to the welfare of common activities, such as farming. Before the establishment of British colonial administration, the egbo was a prominent Ekoi secret society that had strong social regulatory functions as well as influence in religious matters. Members of the egbo used a form of ideographic writing called nsibidi, variations of which were formerly found among other ethnic groups in southeastern Nigeria.

The Ekoi practice traditional medicine and have treated such diseases as smallpox with local medicinal plants. In addition to displaying an extensive knowledge of and aesthetic appreciation for flowers, the Ekoi create mural paintings on sanctuaries, make pottery, and carve figures in solid basaltic blocks. They are also known for their large, skin-covered masks.

According to Oral Tradition, the EKoi people, called Manyu people are descendants of the Asher tribe of Ancient Israel. The tribe of Asher were the descendants of the eighth son of Jacob in the bible. This tribe was the most blessed with male children, and its women so beautiful. That may be a reason for their women usually and quickly sought for marriage in present Cameroon. Asher had a trait of being secluded into family-based community dwellers with fierce affinity to freedom and independence but were always quick to join coalition of Jewish confederations to fight wars against outsiders.
In 1200 BC, they were part of the loose confederation of Israelite tribes referred to a United Kingdom of Israel that went to war against the Canaanites. After the conquest of Canaan, Joshua allocated the fertile land in the Western and Coastal Galilee to the tribe of Asher. 
The period between 1200 BC and 1050 Asher and all other tribes that made up this Israeli confederation were loyal to the leader, King Saul who became a monarch. This was not what the Asher people ascribed to. Therefore, in 931 BC after the death of Saul, tribe of Asher, along with other Northern tribes revolted and made David the King of the reunited Kingdom of Israel.  By 930 BC the northern tribes split from the kingdom under King David to reform a Northern Kingdom. Asher was a member of this kingdom until the kingdom was conquered by the King of Assyria in 723 BC and they were partially dispersed and deported from their land. “The tribe of Asher apparently settled among the Phoenicians in the upper region of Palestine, beyond the tribe of Zebulun and west of the tribe of Naphtali.” As they wandered in the wilderness in search of a new place to settle. Henceforth, the tribe of Asher has been counted as one of the Ten Lost Tribes of Israel because some of the descendants got assimilated by other tribes  and finally disappeared as distinctive people that merged into the tribe of Judah and lost their identity. 
Their selection of a next place to settle was guided by their ancestral principle that stated that they could only settle where they found water, vegetation, and a hexagonal stone. This hexagonal basaltic stone (today called Ntai Ngbe/Nfam) is what signified “prosperity and lasting peace”. “Nfam” became one of the symbols of “Ngbe” which is the soul of their governing structure.

 
Ekoi